The list of shipwrecks in April 1939 includes ships sunk, foundered, grounded, or otherwise lost during April 1939.

1 April

2 April

3 April

7 April

8 April

9 April

12 April

13 April

14 April

15 April

17 April

18 April

19 April

20 April

22 April

24 April

25 April

27 April

29 April

Unknown date

References

1939-04
 04